Emmanuel Bitanga (5 November 1953 – 9 December 2008) was a Cameroonian sprinter. He competed in the men's 200 metres at the 1984 Summer Olympics.

References

1953 births
2008 deaths
Athletes (track and field) at the 1984 Summer Olympics
Cameroonian male sprinters
Olympic athletes of Cameroon
Place of birth missing